In probability theory and statistics, a conditional variance is the variance of a random variable given the value(s) of one or more other variables.
Particularly in econometrics, the conditional variance is also known as the scedastic function or skedastic function. Conditional variances are important parts of autoregressive conditional heteroskedasticity (ARCH) models.

Definition
The conditional variance of a random variable Y given another random variable X is 

The conditional variance tells us how much variance is left if we use  to "predict" Y.
Here, as usual,  stands for the conditional expectation of Y given X,
which we may recall, is a random variable itself (a function of X, determined up to probability one).
As a result,  itself is a random variable (and is a function of X).

Explanation, relation to least-squares 

Recall that variance is the expected squared deviation between a random variable (say, Y) and its expected value. 
The expected value can be thought of as a reasonable prediction of the outcomes of the random experiment (in particular, the expected value is the best constant prediction when predictions are assessed by expected squared prediction error). Thus, one interpretation of variance is that it gives the smallest possible expected squared prediction error. If we have the knowledge of another random variable (X) that we can use to predict Y, we can potentially use this knowledge to reduce the expected squared error. As it turns out, the best prediction of Y given X is the conditional expectation. In particular, for any  measurable,

By selecting , the second, nonnegative term becomes zero, showing the claim.
Here, the second equality used the law of total expectation.
We also see that the expected conditional variance of Y given X shows up as the irreducible error of predicting Y given only the knowledge of X.

Special cases, variations

Conditioning on discrete random variables
When X takes on countable many values  with positive probability, i.e., it is a discrete random variable, we can introduce , the conditional variance of Y given that X=x for any x from S as follows:

Note that here  defines a constant for possible values of x, and in particular, is not a random variable.

Then,  almost surely.

Definition using conditional distributions
The "conditional expectation of Y given X=x" can also be defined more generally
using the conditional distribution of Y given X (this exists in this case, as both here X and Y are real-valued).

In particular, letting    be the (regular) conditional distribution  of Y given X, i.e.,  (the intention is that  almost surely over the support of X), we can define

This can, of course, be specialized to when Y is discrete itself (replacing the integrals with sums), and also when the conditional density of Y given X=x with respect to some underlying distribution exists.

Components of variance
The law of total variance says

In words: the variance of Y is the sum of the expected conditional variance of Y given X and the variance of the conditional expectation of Y given X. The first term captures the variation left after "using X to predict Y", while the second term captures the variation due to the mean of the prediction of Y due to the randomness of X.

See also
Mixed model
Random effects model

References

Further reading
 

Statistical deviation and dispersion
Theory of probability distributions
Conditional probability